Hajjiabad-e Okhtachi (also Romanized as Ḩājjīābād-e Okhtāchī) is a village in Akhtachi-ye Mahali Rural District, Simmineh District, Bukan County, West Azerbaijan Province, Iran. At the 2006 census, its population was 934, in 191 families.

References 

Populated places in Bukan County